Merica purpuriformis is a species of sea snail, a marine gastropod mollusk in the family Cancellariidae, the nutmeg snails.

Description

Distribution

References

 Pritchard G.B. & Gatliff J. H. (1899). On some new species of Victorian Mollusca. Proceedings of the Royal Society of Victoria, new series. new ser., 11(2): 179-184, pl. 20

Cancellariidae
Gastropods described in 1841